Pauline Harvey (born November 17, 1950) is a Quebec writer.

The daughter of Laurent-Jules Harvey and Marcelle Gagnon, she was born in Alma, Quebec and was educated at Laval University and the Université de Vincennes. She worked in Ottawa as a reporter for Radio Canada and as a government translator. She performed sound poetry in Montreal and at international conferences.

Harvey published her first novel Le Deuxième monopoly des précieux in 1981, which received the Prix des jeunes écrivains from the Journal de Montréal. Her writing has appeared in the magazines Hobo-Québec, Mainmise, Arcade and Lèvres urbaines.

Selected works 
 La Ville au gueux, novel (1982)
 Encore une partie pour Berri, novel (1985), received the Prix Molson from the Académie des lettres du Québec
 Un homme est une valse, novel (1992), received the Prix Québec-Paris

References 

1950 births
Living people
Canadian novelists in French
Canadian poets in French
Canadian women novelists
Canadian women poets
20th-century Canadian novelists
20th-century Canadian poets
20th-century Canadian women writers
21st-century Canadian novelists
21st-century Canadian poets
21st-century Canadian women writers
Université Laval alumni
People from Alma, Quebec
Writers from Quebec